Desmosterolosis in medicine and biology is a defect in cholesterol biosynthesis. It results in an accumulation of desmosterol and a variety of associated symptoms. Only two cases have been reported as of 2007. The condition is due to inactivating mutations in 24-dehydrocholesterol reductase. Certain anticholesterolemic and antiestrogenic drugs such as triparanol, ethamoxytriphetol, and clomifene have been found to inhibit conversion of desmosterol into cholesterol and to induce desmosterolosis, for instance cataracts.

References

External links

Cholesterol and steroid metabolism disorders